Elva Landscape Conservation Area is a nature park situated in Tartu County, Estonia.

Its area is 1064 ha.

The protected area was designated in 2016 to protect areas and nature of Elva Parish and adjacent areas from Nõo and Otepää Parish.

References

Nature reserves in Estonia
Geography of Tartu County